Lame is a Bantu dialect cluster spoken Nigeria. The Rufu *Ruhu) and Mbaru dialects are extinct as of 1987. Blench (2019) also lists Gura as a dialect.

References

Jarawan languages
Languages of Nigeria